This is a list of films which have placed number one at the weekend box office in the United Kingdom during 2001.

See also 
 List of British films — British films by year
 Lists of box office number-one films

References

External links
 UK weekend box office reports 2001-2006

2001
United Kingdom
Box office number-one films